Sakharov Gardens (Ginot Sakharov) is a busy intersection on the highway from Tel Aviv to Jerusalem, located close to the main entry point to Jerusalem from the West. It is named after the Soviet physicist and human rights activist Andrei Sakharov.

Due to the frequent traffic congestion at the intersection, a project to upgrade it to an interchange is set to commence by 2019.

References

Road junctions in Israel